Razianeh Kari (also Romanized as Rāzīāneh Kārī; also known as Rāyjānkārī and Rāzīān-e Kārī) is a village in Bakesh-e Yek Rural District, in the Central District of Mamasani County, Fars Province, Iran. At the 2006 census, its population was 1,052, in 237 families.

References 

Populated places in Mamasani County